Dennis Lightfoot (born 1962) is an English male former track cyclist

Cycling career
Lightfoot was a British track champion after winning the British National Keirin Championships in 1986, just three months after switching from amateur to professional status.

References

1962 births
British male cyclists
British track cyclists
Living people
Sportspeople from Warrington